Tuscawilla Plantation was a large cotton plantation of  located in eastern Leon County, Florida, United States established by George W. Parkhill.

Location 
Tuscawilla Plantation bordered the northern tip of the south tract of Chemonie Plantation. Today, the land that was Tuscawilla is now the neighborhoods east of Chaires Cross Road and the north and south sides of Buck Lake Road, much of Baum Road, north and south sides of I-10, including Heartwood Hills, Tung Grove Road, Pennewaw Trace, and Bexhill Lane.

Plantation specifics 
The Leon County Florida 1860 Agricultural Census shows that the William Bailey Plantation had the following:
 Improved Land: 
 Unimproved Land: 
 Cash value of plantation: $36,000
 Cash value of farm implements/machinery: $1500
 Cash value of farm animals: $10,000
 Number of slaves: 172
 Bushels of corn: 3000
 Bales of cotton: 200

The owner 
John Parkhill was a physician by trade and a native of Ireland and left Richmond, Virginia on April 15, 1827, with his brother-in-law William Copland in a stagecoach headed south. Parkhill left his wife and 2-year-old son behind. Parkhill and Copland headed to Florida to examine and purchase land. Parkhill worked as a postmaster and banker in Tallahassee.

Parkhill joined the Confederate Army August 20, 1861 as a Captain and died at the Seven Days Battle near Gaines' farm and  Richmond, Virginia between June 25, 1862, and July 1, 1862.

References 
Rootsweb Plantations
Largest Slaveholders from 1860 Slave Census Schedules
Paisley, Clifton; From Cotton To Quail, University of Florida Press, c1968.
UNC Library

Plantations in Leon County, Florida
Cotton plantations in Florida